The 1930 International Cross Country Championships was held in Royal Leamington Spa, England, on 22 March 1930.  A report on the event was given in the Glasgow Herald.

Complete results, medallists, 
 and the results of British athletes were published.

Medallists

Individual Race Results

Men's (9.5 mi / 15.3 km)

Team Results

Men's

Participation
An unofficial count yields the participation of 61 athletes from 7 countries.

 (9)
 (9)
 (9)
 (9)
 (9)
 (7)
 (9)

See also
 1930 in athletics (track and field)

References

International Cross Country Championships
International Cross Country Championships
Cross
International Cross Country Championships
International Cross Country Championships
Cross country running in the United Kingdom
Leamington Spa
Sport in Warwickshire
20th century in Warwickshire